Formula E, officially the ABB FIA Formula E World Championship, is a single-seater motorsport championship for electric cars. The series was conceived in 2011 in Paris by then FIA president Jean Todt and Spanish businessman Alejandro Agag, who is also the current chairman of Formula E Holdings. The inaugural championship race was held in Beijing in September 2014. Since 2020, the series has FIA world championship status.

History

The proposal for a city-based, single-seater electric car motor racing championship was conceived by Jean Todt, the president of the world governing body of motorsport, the Fédération Internationale de l'Automobile (FIA), and presented to politicians Alejandro Agag and Antonio Tajani at a dinner at a small Italian restaurant in the French capital Paris on 3 March 2011. Tajani was concentrated on the electrification of the automobile industry, reducing carbon-dioxide emissions and introducing hybrid and electric systems. Agag supported Todt's proposal after the latter discussed the FIA opening up a tender to organise the series. Agag told Todt that he would take on the task because of his prior experience in negotiating contracts with television stations, sponsorship and marketing.

Since the 2020–21 season, Formula E is an FIA World Championship, making it the first single-seater racing series outside of Formula One to be given world championship status.

Regulations

The Formula E championship is currently contested by eleven teams with two drivers each. The sport features electric-powered race cars similar in style to the hybrid-drive cars of Formula One.

Race day format

A race day starts with two practice sessions in the morning: an opening 45-minute session followed by a further 30-minute session. During these sessions, the drivers are free to use the full qualifying power output (currently 250 kW (335 bhp)), with a single 45 minute session on a double header Sunday. From season 8, all practice sessions are 30 minutes.

The qualifying session takes place later in the day and lasts approximately one hour. Under the current format (introduced in season 8), the drivers are split into two groups based on their position in the championship, those in odd-numbered places go into group A, while those in even-numbered places go into group B. The exception is in the first race of the season, where each team can nominate one driver into each group. Each group gets a 10-minute session to set a fastest lap at 220kW, of which the top 4 of each group will advance to the "duels" stage, where drivers face off head-to-head at 250kW over a quarter-final, semi-final and final. The winner of the final then lines up in position 1, the loser of the final in position 2, the losers of the semi-final in positions 3 and 4, and the losers of the quarter-final in positions 5 through 8, in order of time set in their respective sessions. The rest of the drivers from the group stage are placed alternately from position 9, with the polesitter's group in the odd places, and the other group in the even places.

The first four seasons had a lap distance set, usually an odd number, with pit-stops to swap cars half way through as the batteries lacked the capacity to last the whole race. During the second generation, the race is set to 45 minutes plus one lap. The introduction of the Gen2 car meant pit stops are no longer necessary, because the battery lasts for the full race. Since the all-weather tyres are designed to last for a whole race, pit stops are currently only needed to change a punctured tyre or to perform repairs on the car. In race mode the maximum power is currently restricted to 200 kW (268 bhp). For the ninth season, laps will replace race time, and to maintain consistency with the transition from race time to laps, safety cars and FCY interventions will now be compensated with extra laps.

For season 6 and 7, each minute under safety car or FCY, 1 kW⋅h of energy is removed from the total usable energy, giving drivers and teams more energy management tactics. From season 8, added time is used, where every full minute under a safety car or full course yellow within the first 40 minutes, 45 seconds is added to the race time up to a maximum of 10 minutes.

Point scoring
Points are awarded to the top ten drivers using the standard FIA system (25-18-15-12-10-8-6-4-2-1). The driver securing the pole position is also awarded 3 points, while the driver setting the fastest lap (if they finish in the top ten) additionally receives 1 point (2 points during the first two seasons). In addition, for season six and seven (2019-21) the driver achieving the fastest lap during group qualifying was awarded 1 point. The championship consists of both a drivers' and teams' championship. A driver's end of season total is made up of a driver's best results. A team's total is made up by counting both drivers' scores throughout the season.

Fanboost
For each race, fans can vote for their favorite driver via the official website or app to give them an extra power boost which can be activated by pushing an overtake button. Voting starts 3 days before the event and closes after the opening 15 minutes of the race. The five winning Fanboost drivers each receive an extra power burst that can be used in a 5-second window during the second half of the race. Fanboost was discontinued for season 9.

Attack mode
With the fifth season, a feature called Attack Mode was introduced, in which drivers received an additional 25 kW in season 5 (35 kW in season 6 and 7)  of power after driving through a designated area of the circuit off the racing line. The duration of the boost mode and the number of boosts available are decided only shortly before each race by the FIA to reduce the time the teams have to find the optimal strategy. All attack modes must be activated at the end of the race, but do not need to be used up (i.e. if a final attack mode is activated in the penultimate lap, the driver is not penalized for having it still activated at the end of the race). If there is a full course yellow period or a safety car, attack mode is not allowed to be activated.

Attack charge 
For season 9, a new feature known as Attack Charge will be trialed at select races. In a predetermined period during the race, the teams must do a mandatory 30 second stop to recharge the car's batteries, and the stop will unlock two enhanced attack mode boosts.

Cars

Spark-Renault SRT_01E

For the first four seasons, an electric racing car built by Spark Racing Technology, called the Spark-Renault SRT 01E, was used. The chassis was designed by Dallara, a battery system was created by Williams Advanced Engineering and a Hewland five-speed gearbox was used. Michelin was the official tyre supplier. For the first season, 42 electric cars were ordered by the series. 4 cars were made available to each of the 10 teams and 2 cars were kept for testing purposes.

This first Formula E car had a power of at least . The generators used to re-charge the batteries are powered by glycerine, a by-product of bio-diesel production.

In the first season, all teams used an electric motor developed by McLaren (the same as that used in its P1 supercar). But since the second season, powertrain manufacturers could build their own electric motor, inverter, gearbox and cooling system although the chassis and battery stayed the same. There were nine manufacturers creating powertrains for the 2016–17 season: ABT Schaeffler, Andretti Technologies, DS-Virgin, Jaguar, Mahindra, NextEV TCR, Penske, Renault, and Venturi.

Spark SRT05e ("Gen2 car")

The second-generation ("Gen2") Formula E car was introduced in the 2018–19 season and features significant technological advances over the previous Spark-Renault SRT 01E car – its 54 kWh battery and power output rising from 200 kW to 250 kW and top speed rising to around 280 km/h (174 mph). The arrival of the Gen2 car also sees an end to the series’ mid-race car-swaps. The new cars are equipped with Brembo braking systems, chosen by Spark Racing Technology as the sole supplier. The new cars are also equipped with the halo, a T-shaped safety cage designed to protect the driver's head in crashes and by deflecting flying objects. Michelin remains as tyre manufacturer, supplying all-weather treaded tyres.

Gen3 car (from 2022)
The Gen3 Formula E car was unveiled to the public at the 2022 Monaco ePrix, for use in the ninth Formula E season (2022–23). Power levels for the car are expected to be 350 kW in qualifying and 300 kW in the race, while regeneration levels will be allowed on both front (250 kW) and rear (350 kW) axles for a maximum of 600 kW recovery under braking. Regenerative braking could provide 40% of the total energy used within a race.

The estimated top speed will be 322 km/h (200 mph). The battery will also be designed to be able to handle "flash-charging" at rates of up to 600 kW, allowing pitstop recharging into the championship for the first time. The wheelbase has been reduced from 3100 mm to 2970 mm and the weight reduced to 760 kg. In July 2020 it was announced that Spark Racing Technology would build the chassis and supply the front axle MGU, Williams Advanced Engineering would supply the battery, and Hankook would supply all-weather tires incorporating bio-material and sustainable rubber.

Comparison

Safety car

During the first seven seasons, a BMW i8 plug-in hybrid was employed as the Formula E safety car. In the 2019–20 season and the 2020–21 season, two versions have been used: one with a roof and a roofless one.

During the 2020–21 season, a Mini Electric (called the Electric Pacesetter by JCW) was used as safety car for selected races.

From 2022, a Porsche Taycan has been used, with a livery sporting the colors of all 11 teams.

Seasons

Champions

2014–15

The calendar consisted of 11 races held in 10 different host cities: Beijing, Putrajaya, Punta del Este, Buenos Aires, Long Beach, Miami, Monte Carlo, Berlin, Moscow and finally London, where last two rounds of the championship took place.

The first Formula E race at the Beijing Olympic Green Circuit on 13 September 2014 was won by Lucas Di Grassi, after Nick Heidfeld and Nicolas Prost crashed out on the final corner. In the course of the season, there were 7 different race winners: Sébastien Buemi (three times), 
Sam Bird (twice), Nelson Piquet Jr. (twice), António Félix da Costa, Nicolas Prost, Jérôme d'Ambrosio and Lucas Di Grassi.
The championship was decided with the last race in London, where Nelson Piquet Jr. became the first Formula E champion, only a single point ahead of Sébastien Buemi. Piquet, Buemi, and Di Grassi all had a theoretical chance at winning the title in the final round.  The team championship was decided on the second to last race, with e.dams Renault (232 points) winning ahead of Dragon Racing (171 points) who surpassed ABT in the final round of the championship.

2015–16

The second season of Formula E started in October 2015 and ended in early July 2016. The calendar consisted of 10 races in 9 different cities. For this season eight manufacturers were introduced, who were allowed to develop new powertrains. Sébastien Buemi won the championship with only 2 points more than Lucas di Grassi by claiming the fastest lap in the final race in London.

2016–17

The 2016–17 FIA Formula E season was the third season of the FIA Formula E championship. It started in October 2016 in Hong Kong and ended in July 2017 in Montreal. Lucas di Grassi won the championship in the last race of the season, 24 points ahead of Sébastien Buemi and 54 points ahead of third-placed rookie driver Felix Rosenqvist. The Renault e.Dams team successfully defended their team championship title.

2017–18

The 2017–18 FIA Formula E season was the fourth season of the FIA Formula E championship. It started in December 2017 in Hong Kong and ended in July 2018. Jean-Éric Vergne clinched the title with a race to spare in New York by finishing fifth while title rival Sam Bird failed to score enough points to keep the fight going into the final race of the season.

After a difficult first half of the season, Audi Sport ABT Schaeffler improved in the second half and passed Techeetah at the final race to claim the teams' championship by two points.

2018–19

The Gen2 race car was introduced for season five with significantly improved power and range, thus eliminating the need to change cars and pit stops altogether except for damage. However, cars are still vulnerable to power exhaustions if red flags and safety cars lengthen races. Gen2 also saw the introduction of the halo driver protection system. The car was unveiled in January 2018.

BMW, Nissan and DS Automobiles would join Formula E as official manufacturers for the 2018–19 season, with Nissan replacing Renault, which had exited the championship to focus its resources on its Formula 1 team. The format of the races also changed from a set number of laps to 45 minutes plus one lap.

The 2019 Hong Kong ePrix was the 50th race of Formula E since its inception in 2014. Formula E raced in 20 cities, across five continents, seen 13 global manufactures commit to the series. Four drivers have started all 50 Formula E races: Lucas di Grassi, Sam Bird, Daniel Abt and Jérôme d'Ambrosio.

After the first race in New York City, Jean-Eric Vergne won his second Formula E championship, becoming the first driver to win more than 1 championship title, and a back-to-back championship title. Techeetah won their first constructor's championship.

2019–20

For the sixth season of Formula E, two more manufacturers joined the series: Mercedes-Benz and Porsche. A number of rule changes were introduced to the championship, most notably the deduction of usable energy under safety car and Full Course Yellow conditions, with drivers having energy subtracted at 1kW⋅h per minute. Due to the COVID-19 pandemic the championship was suspended in March 2020 and all scheduled races were eventually cancelled. The season was completed in August with six races at the Tempelhof Airport Street Circuit in Berlin on three different layouts (a race on the reverse layout, a race on the normal layout, and a race with a new extended layout) with two races each.

The season's champion was António Félix da Costa who clinched his first title with two races left. DS Techeetah became team champions for the second time in a row.

2020–21 

Starting with its seventh season, the Formula E Championship was granted FIA World Championship status, due to it having met the criteria of having four manufacturer competitors and races on three continents since the 2015–16 season. The facelift of the Spark Gen2 car called the Gen2 EVO, was originally scheduled to debut in this season, but was later delayed and eventually cancelled due to the COVID-19 pandemic.

In late 2020, Audi and BMW announced their withdrawal from Formula E after the 2020–21 season, although BMW allowed Andretti Autosport to also use their powertrain during the following season.

The season ended in August 2021 with 15 races. Nyck de Vries claimed his first world champion title after winning two races, while Mercedes-EQ won the teams' championship.

2021–22 

The 2021–22 FIA Formula E season is the eighth season of the FIA Formula E World Championship and the final season of the "Gen2" car era. The season started in January 2022 in Diriyah.

Instead of removing usable energy from drivers under the safety car and FCY, there will be added time to the race. For every full minute the race is neutralized within the first 40 minutes, there is 45 seconds of added time. This can add up to a maximum of 10 minutes.

Race power was also increased to 220 kW and attack mode was increased to 250kW, matching the power from Fanboost.

Season 8 also introduced a new qualifying format, featuring 2 groups, A and B, where the top 4 in each would progress to duels.
Stoffel Vandoorne won the Drivers title, whilst Mercedes EQ won the teams championship for the second time in a row.

2022–23 
The 2022-23 FIA Formula E season will be the ninth season of the FIA Formula E World Championship, and will be the debut season of the Gen3 era. It will see Maserati and McLaren make their debuts in the series and the return of Abt Sportsline with the Spanish brand Cupra Racing. 

For season 9, laps will replace timed races, and for every safety car or FCY intervention, there will be added laps to compensate for missed racing laps. 

Pit stops will make a return to the series, in the form of Attack Charge, set to be trialed at select races.

At at least two races, every team must field a driver with no previous Formula E experience in the first practice session. This is to give up-and-coming drivers a chance to experience the uniqueness of Formula E racing.

The opening race of the 2023 ABB Formula E World Championship was held in Mexico. This race was won by Jake Dennis who currently races for the Avalanche Andretti Autosport team.

Esport series 

In 2019, the Virtually Live Ghost Racing app was launched. It allows fans to virtually drive alongside the real drivers as the race is going on.

In 2020, during the season suspension due to the COVID-19 pandemic, Formula E held an esport series called Race at Home Challenge.

In 2021, Formula E introduced a new series called Formula E: Accelerate using the online game rFactor 2. The first season of six races and was held between January and March 2021. All Formula E teams participated in the series.

Support series

FE School Series
During the first season, the FE School Series for student teams that developed their own electric car took place as support races at selected events. The series was not continued during the second season.

Roborace

Roborace was developing the world's first autonomous and electrically powered racing car. The company planned to develop the first global championship for driverless cars. It held demonstrations at selected races during the 2016–17 Formula E season and 2017–18 Formula E season.

Jaguar I-Pace eTrophy

Formula E and Jaguar ran a production-based support series with Jaguar I-Pace battery electric SUVs. The series was called the I-Pace eTrophy and ran together with Formula E's fifth and sixth seasons (December 2018 to summer 2020). In May 2020, Jaguar announced the cancellation of the series.

Media

Television

Formula E provides comprehensive live television coverage shown via major broadcasters around the globe (FOX Sports, Channel 4, CCTV-5, Eurosport, Canal+, J Sports, Ziggo Sport Totaal, SABC Sport, TV Cultura). Production is carried out by Aurora Media Worldwide.
Since the first season, the world feed is presented by Jack Nicholls and Dario Franchitti, with Nicki Shields acting as pit lane reporter. West Gillett serves as the TV director.

Documentary
Directors Fisher Stevens and Malcolm Venville created a documentary movie about the 2017–18 season called And We Go Green. It highlights some of the innovations and challenges of Formula E and follows several drivers and rivalries throughout the season. The film was co-produced by Leonardo di Caprio and premiered at the 2019 Toronto International Film Festival.

On 22 November 2021, Formula E released a 15 episode documentary series called Formula E Unplugged on their official YouTube channel (similar to Netflix's Formula 1: Drive to Survive), which dives behind the scenes into the teams and drivers as they battle to become the sport's first World Champion in its first season with World Championship status.

Marbula E

In April 2020, Envision Virgin Racing partnered with Jelle's Marble Runs to create Marbula E; a parody of the Formula E series using a series of marble runs based on real tracks from the 2020 Formula E season. Commentary was provided by official Formula E commentator Jack Nicholls and Jelle's Marble Racing commentator Greg Woods. By July 2020, Marbula E had attracted over 10 million views and over 70 million social media impressions across YouTube channels and Facebook pages for both Envision Virgin Racing and Jelle's Marble Runs.

See also
 Electric motorsport
 List of Formula E ePrix
 List of Formula E drivers
 Extreme E

References

External links

 
 
  (Formula E Channel)

 
Formula racing series
One-make series
Green racing
Recurring sporting events established in 2014
Articles containing video clips
Open wheel racing